Early architectural photographers include Roger Fenton, Francis Frith (Middle East and Britain), Samuel Bourne, Inclined Studio (India) and Albert Levy (United States and Europe). They paved the way for the modern speciality of architectural photography. Later architectural photography had practitioners such as Ezra Stoller and Julius Shulman. Stoller worked mainly on the east coast of America, having graduated with a degree in architecture in the 1930s. Shulman, who was based on the West Coast, became an architectural photographer after some images that he had taken of one of Richard Neutra's houses in California made their way onto the architect's desk.

Notable architectural photographers 

Berenice Abbott
Eugène Atget
James Austin
Iwan Baan
Bernd and Hilla Becher
 Hélène Binet (b. 1959)
Jack Boucher
Sergio Castiglione
Phyllis Dearborn
Frederick H. Evans
Lucien Hervé
Carol M. Highsmith
Candida Höfer
Julien Lanoo
Bedford Lemere
Eric de Maré
Robert J. Massar
Duccio Malagamba
Lucia Moholy
Andrew Prokos
Marvin Rand
Tim Rawle
Julius Shulman
Wolfgang Sievers
G. E. Kidder Smith
Ezra Stoller
Wayne Thom
Pierre Trémaux
Iwao Yamawaki

See also
 Perspective control lens
 Perspective control
 View camera

References

External links

International Association of Architectural Photographers-IAAP
AIAP - The Association of Independent Architectural Photographers
ASMP, Architectural Photographers Group 
ViewFinder - over 85,000 photographs from the archives of English Heritage

 
Arts occupations